Khilona (Khilauna/The Toy) is a 1942 social Hindi film directed by Sarvottam Badami. The film was produced at Ranjit Studios  by Amar Pictures. It had music by Khemchand Prakash with lyrics by Pandit Indra Chandra. Khilona was one of the major films which brought the actress Snehprabha Pradhan into prominence. The cast included Snehprabha Pradhan,  P. Jairaj, Prabha, Satish, Kanhaiyalal and Pratima Devi.

Cast
 Snehprabha Pradhan as Asha
 P. Jairaj as Amar
 Prabha as Maya
 Satish as Kishore
 Kanhaiyalal 
 Pratima Devi as Lady Mazumdar
 Baburao Sansare as Doctor
 Nagendra as tailor
 Pesi Patel

Music
The film had music by Khemchand Prakash with lyrics by Pandit Indra Chandra. The singers were Snehaprabha Pradhan, Khan Mastana and Sumati Trilokekar. Khemchand Prakash was influenced by Prithviraj Kapoor to make the move from Calcutta to Bombay, where he mainly worked for Ranjit Movietone.

Song List

References

External links
 

1942 films
1940s Hindi-language films
Films scored by Khemchand Prakash
Indian black-and-white films
Films directed by Sarvottam Badami